Jay Kim (born 1939) is Korean-American politician.

Jay Kim may also refer to:
Kim Jung-ju (1968−2022), South Korean businessman
Jay Kim (businessman) (born 1976), South Korean-born American entrepreneur
Jay (South Korean singer) (born 1983), South Korean singer and actor